This article contains a complete list of Michelin starred restaurants in Los Angeles and Southern California. Michelin published restaurant guides for Los Angeles in 2008 and 2009 but suspended the publication in 2010.  Publication of the guide would resume in 2019. In 2022, Michelin published a guide covering the entire state of California, awarding stars to 34 restaurants in Greater Los Angeles and Southern California.

2022
The 2022 edition of the Michelin Guide again covers the whole state of California.

2008-2021
The 2019 and 2021 edition of the Michelin Guide covers the whole state of California.

References

Lists of restaurants
Restaurants in Los Angeles
Los Angeles
Los Angeles-related lists
Restaurants in Orange County, California